Mustafa Nukić (born 3 December 1990) is a Slovenian footballer who plays as a forward for Olimpija Ljubljana.

In a journeyman career, he made over 130 Slovenian PrvaLiga appearances for Celje, Triglav Kranj, Koper, Bravo and Olimpija Ljubljana. He contributed 17 goals as Bravo won the Slovenian Second League in 2018–19.

Career
Born in Vlasenica (now in Republika Srpska, Bosnia and Herzegovina), Nukić and his mother immigrated to Ljubljana, Slovenia when he was 18 months old due to the outbreak of the Bosnian War. He was raised in refugee accommodation in Vič, where he was joined by his father and stayed there until the sixth grade of primary school. Prohibited from going to kindergarten, he did not meet Slovenians until he began primary school. He was a childhood fan and youth player for Olimpija Ljubljana. 

Nukić spent his early career with several teams in the Slovenian PrvaLiga and Slovenian Second League, including Koper, a team that he called the best organised in Slovenia, but also the worst experience of his career due to disagreements with manager Rodolfo Vanoli. For three years, he studied economics at university, while working for office supply company Extra Lux. He had the only foreign footballing experience of his career in 2015 at Annabichler SV in the Austrian Regionalliga (third tier), an experience he disliked because of the long driving distances.

Nukić transferred in July 2018 from Ilirija 1911 to Bravo. In 2018–19, he scored 17 goals as his team won the Second League title, but in the following campaign he scored only three goals in 34 games while adding six assists. In 2020–21, he was the league's top assist provider with eleven, as well as scoring seven goals.

On 25 June 2021, at the age of 30, he returned to Olimpija on a two-year deal. He made his professional debut for the team on 22 July in his first European match, in which he scored the only goal of a UEFA Europa Conference League second qualifying round first leg at home to Birkirkara of Malta. The Professional Footballers' Union of Slovenia named him in the Best XI of the season.

Honours
Bravo
Slovenian Second League: 2018–19

References

External links
NZS profile 

1990 births
Living people
Slovenian footballers
People from Vlasenica
Footballers from Ljubljana
Association football forwards
NK IB 1975 Ljubljana players
NK Ivančna Gorica players
NK Celje players
NK Radomlje players
NK Svoboda Ljubljana players
NK Triglav Kranj players
FC Koper players
ND Ilirija 1911 players
NK Bravo players
NK Olimpija Ljubljana (2005) players
Slovenian Second League players
Slovenian PrvaLiga players
Slovenian expatriate footballers
Slovenian expatriate sportspeople in Austria
Expatriate footballers in Austria
Slovenia youth international footballers
Bosnia and Herzegovina emigrants to Slovenia